The Export–Import Bank of China (Chexim - China Exim Bank) is one of two institutional banks in China chartered to implement the state policies in industry, foreign trade, economy, and foreign aid to other developing countries, and provide policy financial support so as to promote the export of Chinese products and services.  Established in 1994, the bank is subordinated to the State Council. In 2022, the bank signed an agreement with Hong Kong realtor group ESR Group and to invest in Asean infrastructure projects.

Mission
The bank is a policy bank and along with other Chinese policy institutions like China Development Bank and Sinosure implement the economic policies of the government. The focus of the bank is to promote foreign trade and investment. Commercial lending forms the backbone of the bank. Commercial activity includes export credits mainly in the infrastructure fields (roads, power plants, oil and gas pipelines, telecom, and water projects) and investment loans for Chinese businesses to establish overseas in the energy, mining and industrial sectors. Another function is to administer concessional loans which are no interest or very low interest loans provided as foreign aid by the Chinese government. Exim is the sole provider of Chinese government concessional loans.

Exim does not publish figures for overseas loans.  However, U.S. officials estimate that it finances more than the total export financing of the Group of Seven industrialized nations combined.  The Financial Times estimates that in 2009 and 2010, China Eximbank and China Development Bank (CDB) together signed loans of at least $110 billion to other developing country governments and companies, more than the World Bank over a similar period.

Rival export financing institutions that have seen a decline in influence, such as the U.S. Export–Import Bank through Chairman Fred Hochberg, have complained that Exim of China doesn't follow the export financing guidelines promulgated by the OECD and so has an unfair advantage.

Foreign aid
The bank is a part of the Chinese foreign aid system and administers the Two Preferential Loan Program. The concessional loan and preferential export buyer's credit are the two main loan products under the preferential loan program.

For concessional loans the bank advances a no interest or very low interest rate loan to a developing country government or agency to build a project (e.g. power plant, road, water treatment facility). The term of the concession loan is up to 20 years and a maximum grace period of 7 years is given. The preferential export buyer's credit is provided to a foreign borrower to purchase Chinese goods or services (e.g. construction contractor building the project). Like the concessional loan, this type of loan is also subsidized by the Chinese government. Interest rates are below market rates at around 3 to 6%. However, the preferential export buyer's credit is generally classified as a commercial loan rather than foreign aid even if the interest rate is very low because the purpose is to promote Chinese exports. These two types of loans are a major part of the financing support for China's Belt and Road Initiative.

During the Covid pandemic, the bank granted the government of Angola an undisclosed amount of debt relief.

In 2023, the EXIM Bank of China has agreed to support Sri Lanka's debt restructuring efforts.The news follow's India's promise to also support Sri Lanka through the debt restructuring program.

Organizational structure

Internal Departments
 Executive Office
 Human Resources Department
 Business Development & Innovation Department
 Corporate Business Department
 Shipping Financing Department
 Onlending Department
 Planning & Financial Management Department
 Evaluation Department
 Auditing Department
 Legal Affairs Department
 International Business Department
 Risk Management Department
 Administrative Department
 Supervision Office
 Economic Research Department
 Department of Special Account Financing
 Corporate Business Department
 Concessional Loan Department
 Treasury Department
 Information Technology Department
 Compliance Department
 Accounting Department
 Workers Union
 Software Development Department
 Party & League Affairs Department

Business branches
There are a total of 21 branches of the bank.
 Anhui Branch
 Beijing Branch
 Chengdu Branch
 Chongqing Branch
 Dalian Branch
 Fujian Branch
 Guangdong Branch
 Heilongjiang Branch
 Hubei Branch
 Hunan Branch
 Jiangsu Branch
 Nanjing Branch
 Ningbo Branch
 Qingdao Branch
 Shanghai Branch
 Shanxi Branch
 Shenzhen Branch
 Tianjin Branch
 Xiamen Branch
 Xi'an Branch
 Xinjiang Branch
 Yunnan Branch
 Zhejiang Branch

See also

 China International Development Cooperation Agency
 Banking in China

References

External links
 Official website of China Exim Bank 

Banks of China
Banks established in 1994
Export credit agencies
Development finance institutions
Chinese foreign aid
Foreign trade of China
Chinese companies established in 1994